Istgah-e Tang-e Haft (also Romanized as Īstgāh-e Tang-e Haft; also known as Tang-e Haft and Tang-i-Haft) is a village in Tang-e Haft Rural District, Papi District, Khorramabad County, Lorestan Province, Iran. At the 2006 census, its population was 408, in 109 families.

References 

Towns and villages in Khorramabad County